Habrocestum virginale is a jumping spider species in the genus Habrocestum that lives in the Yemen. It was first described in 2007.

References

Salticidae
Spiders of the Arabian Peninsula
Spiders described in 2007
Taxa named by Wanda Wesołowska